Raymond Leslie Penney (1937-1992), was a male rowing coxswain who competed for England.

Rowing career
He represented England and won a bronze medal in the eights at the 1958 British Empire and Commonwealth Games in Cardiff, Wales.

The eights crew consisted entirely of members of the Thames Rowing Club and who won the final of the Empire Games Trials from the 1st and 3rd Trinity Boat Club, Cambridge.

References

1937 births
1992 deaths
English male rowers
Commonwealth Games medallists in rowing
Commonwealth Games bronze medallists for England
Rowers at the 1958 British Empire and Commonwealth Games
Medallists at the 1958 British Empire and Commonwealth Games